Lee Sang-Yoon (born 10 April 1969) is a retired South Korean football player.

He played mostly for Ilhwa Chunma.

He played for the South Korea national football team and was a participant at two edition of FIFA World Cup, in 1990 and 1998.

Honors
Seongnam Ilhwa Chunma (including Ilhwa Chunma, Cheonan Ilhwa Chunma)
 K-League
 Champion : 1993, 1994, 1995
 Runner-up : 1992
 Korean FA Cup
 Champion : 1999
 Runner-up : 1997, 2000
 League Cup
 Champion : 1992
 Runner-up : 1995, 2000
 AFC Champions League
 Champion : 1995–96
 Runner-up : 1996–97
 Asian Super Cup
 Champion : 1996
 Afro-Asian Club Championship
 Champion : 1996

Club career statistics

International goals
Results list South Korea's goal tally first.

External links 
 
 National Team Player Record 
 France Football League Player Profile 
 
 

1998 FIFA World Cup players
1990 FIFA World Cup players
Seongnam FC players
Jeju United FC players
FC Lorient players
K League 1 Most Valuable Player Award winners
K League 1 players
Ligue 1 players
Association football midfielders
Expatriate footballers in France
South Korean expatriate sportspeople in France
South Korean expatriate footballers
South Korea international footballers
South Korean footballers
Konkuk University alumni
Sportspeople from Daejeon
1969 births
Living people